Gamma irradiation is exposure to ionizing radiation with gamma rays. It may also refer to the following processes in particular:
 Ionizing radiation sterilization
 Food irradiation
 Gamma knife, used in radiosurgery